is an annual music show in Japan sponsored by Yomiuri TV. It is broadcast on Yomiuri TV and Nippon Television.

Details

Other winners 
This is a partial list of artists who have won awards other than a Grand Prix.
 2007 Newcomer Award: Cute, Uruma Delvi, Leah Dizon, Jyongri, Satomi Takasugi
2009 Gold Artist: AKB48, BIG BANG, Kumi Koda, GIRL NEXT DOOR, JUJU, AAA, Kana Nishino.

References

External links 
 
 

Awards established in 2003
2003 establishments in Japan
Japanese music awards